Carlos Amorales (Mexico City, 1970) is a multidisciplinary artist who studied at the Gerrit Rietveld Academy and the Rijksakademie in Amsterdam. The most extensive researches in his work encompass Los Amorales (1996-2001), Liquid Archive (1999-2010), Nuevos Ricos (2004-2009), and a typographic exploration in junction with cinema (2013–present).

Biography
Carlos Amorales (Mexico City, 1970) lives and works in Mexico.
He is a multidisciplinary artist who studied at the Gerrit Rietveld Academy and the Rijksakademie in Amsterdam. He has participated in  residencies with Atelier Calder, Saché, France (2012); Mac/Val, Val-de-Marne, France (2011); and the Smithsonian Artists Research Fellowship, Washington, D.C. (2010).

Career
Amorales works in a variety of media, including video, animation, painting, drawing, sculpture, and performance. Much of his work explores the limits of language and translation systems to venture into the field of cultural experimentation. He uses graphic production as a tool to develop linguistic structures and alternative working models that allow new forms of interpretation and foster collectivity. In his projects, Amorales examines identity construction processes, proposes a constant re signification of forms present in his work, and provokes a clash between art and pop culture.

Since 1998, Amorales has been building his "Liquid Archive", a digital database of his drawings in the form of vector graphics which he uses produce visual compositions in various media. The graphics, birds, spiders, trees, kneeling figures in blacks, reds, and grays reappear throughout his work and provide his signature style. In 2007, Amorales lent his "Liquid Archive" to the Dutch graphic design duo Mevis & Van Deursen (Armand Mevis and Linda van Deursen) who collaborated with Amorales to produce the book "Carlos Amorales: Liquid Archive, Why Fear The Future".

His early works also featured masked Mexican wrestlers inspired by the Lucha libre performing in wrestling rings throughout the world. In 2003, the wrestling performance Amorales v. Amorales was staged at the Tate Modern in London, the Pompidou Center in Paris and the San Francisco Museum of Modern Art. His animation piece, Useless Wonder (2006) was shown at the Miami Basel art fair. Recently, Amorales has had solo exhibitions at the MALBA in Buenos Aires, the Milton Keynes Gallery in Milton Keynes UK, Yvon Lambert Paris, the MUAC in Mexico City, the Philadelphia Museum of Art.

In 2008, his exhibition Discarded Spider toured at the Contemporary Arts Center, Cincinnati. For this show, Amorales also staged a performance with the Cincinnati Ballet.

In 2015, his work Triangle Constellation was installed in the Calderwood courtyard of the Harvard University Art Museums.

He has numerous solo exhibitions as Black Cloud, Power Plant, (Toronto, 2015); El Esplendor Geométrico, Kurimanzutto (México, 2015), Germinal, Museo Tamayo (México, 2013); Nuevos Ricos, Kunsthalle Fridericianum (Kassel, 2010); Four Animations, Five Drawings and a Plague, Philadelphia Museum of Art (2008); Discarded Spider, Cincinnati Art Center (2008), to mention a few.

Exhibitions
Amorales has exhibited in many solo and group exhibitions, including:

Select solo exhibitions
Germinal, Museo Rufino Tamayo, Mexico City (2013) 
Four Animations, Five Drawings, and a Plague, Philadelphia Museum of Art (2008)

Select group exhibitions
50th Venice Biennale, Dutch Pavilion (2003)
PERFORMA07, New York (2007)
Martian Museum of Terrestrial Art, Barbican Centre (2008)
Manifesta 9 (2012)
Sharjah Biennial 11 (2013)
Liverpool Biennial (2014)
 What We Have Overlooked, Framed Framed (2016)

Public collections
The artist's work is featured in many public collections, including:
 
Cisneros Foundation, New York
La Colección Jumex, Mexico City
Guggenheim Museum, New York
Irish Museum of Modern Art, Dublin 
Margulies Collection,  Miami
Minneapolis Institute of Art
Museo Rufino Tamayo, Mexico City
Museo Universitario Arte Contemporáneo, Mexico City
Museum of Modern Art, New York 
Museum Boijmans van Beuningen, Rotterdam
Philadelphia Museum of Art 
Walker Art Center, Minneapolis

Art market
Amorales is represented by kurimanzutto in Mexico City.

References

External links
Artist website
Page on Amorales's solo exhibit at the Museum of Latin American Art of Buenos Aires (in Spanish)

Article from the BBC's "collective" (culture magazine) 
Carlos Amorales in ArtNexus Magazine
Carlos Amorales at Kunsthalle Fridericianum, Kassel
 "Carlos Amorales", Artnet
 Carlos Amorales at Highpoint Center for Printmaking, Minneapolis
 Carlos Amorales at Kadist Art Foundation

1970 births
Living people
Mexican contemporary artists
Artists from Mexico City